Filippo Maria Pandolfi (born 1 November 1927 in Bergamo) is a former Italian politician, minister, and European commissioner.

Pandolfi graduated in philosophy at the Università Cattolica Milano, taught for some years and then worked for a publisher of scholastic books.

He was a member of the Christian Democracy party. He was elected to the Italian parliament in 1968, heading the list in electoral district of Brescia–Bergamo in 1976, 1979, 1983, and 1987.

Filippo Pandolfi was finance undersecretary in the Aldo Moro government from 1974 to 1976. In 1976 he became Minister of Finance, in 1978 Minister of the Treasury, then from 1980 to 1983 Minister for Industry and Trade, and finally from 1983 to 1988 Minister of Agriculture and Forestry.

From 6 January 1989 to 5 January 1993 he was the European Commissioner in the Delors Commission, having portfolio for Research and Development.

References

External links
Online biography at Atheneum NAE website 

1927 births
Possibly living people
Politicians from Bergamo
Christian Democracy (Italy) politicians
20th-century Italian politicians
Università Cattolica del Sacro Cuore alumni
Finance ministers of Italy
Agriculture ministers of Italy
Italian European Commissioners